Praeludium and Allegro (in the style of Pugnani) is a piece for violin and piano written by Fritz Kreisler. It was a musical hoax originally ascribed to Gaetano Pugnani.

History
The piece was first published in 1905, among others pieces the composer ascribed to lesser-known composers of the 18th Century.  It is now one of the most popular works in the violin repertoire, and an important step in the violin pedagogy.

References 

Compositions for violin and piano
Compositions by Fritz Kreisler
1905 compositions